Orange County, often known by its initials O.C., is located in the Los Angeles metropolitan area in Southern California. As of the 2020 census, the population was 3,186,989, making it the third-most-populous county in California, the sixth-most-populous in the United States, and more populous than 19 American states and Washington, D.C. Although largely suburban, it is the second-most-densely-populated county in the state behind San Francisco County. The county's three most-populous cities are Anaheim, Santa Ana, and Irvine, each of which has a population exceeding 300,000. Santa Ana is also the county seat. Six cities in Orange County are on the Pacific coast: Seal Beach, Huntington Beach, Newport Beach, Laguna Beach, Dana Point, and San Clemente.

Orange County is included in the Los Angeles-Long Beach-Anaheim Metropolitan Statistical Area. The county has 34 incorporated cities. Older cities like Tustin, Santa Ana, Anaheim, Orange, and Fullerton have traditional downtowns dating back to the 19th century, while newer commercial development or "edge cities" stretch along the Interstate 5 (Santa Ana) Freeway between Disneyland and Santa Ana and between South Coast Plaza and the Irvine Business Complex, and cluster at Irvine Spectrum. Although single-family homes make up the dominant landscape for most of the county, Northern and Central Orange County is relatively more urbanized and dense as compared to those areas south of Irvine, which are less dense, though still contiguous and primarily suburban rather than exurban.

It is also home to a major research university, the University of California, Irvine (UCI), along with a number of other notable colleges and universities such as Chapman University and Cal State Fullerton.

History

Indigenous 

Archeological evidence shows the area to have been inhabited beginning about 9,500 years ago. At the time of European contact, the northern area of what is now Orange County was primarily inhabited by the Tongva, a part of Tovaangar, while the southern area of the county, below Aliso Creek, was primarily inhabited by the Acjachemen. Both groups lived in villages throughout the area. Large villages were sometimes multiethnic and multilingual, such as Genga, located in what is now Newport Beach. The village was shared by the Tongva and Acjachemen. The village of Puhú was located in what is now Black Star Canyon and was shared by multiple groups, including the Tongva, Acjachemen, Serrano and Payómkawichum.

The mother village of the Acjachemen was Putiidhem and is now located in San Juan Capistrano underneath Junipero Serra Catholic High School. For the Tongva, north Orange County was at the southern extent of their village sites. In coastal villages like Lupukngna, at least 3,000 years old located in what is now Huntington Beach, villagers likely used te'aats or plank boats to navigate the coastline, with fish and shellfish being more central to the diet. In inland villages such as Hutuknga, rabbit and mule deer were more central, in addition to acorns from oak trees and seeds from grasses and sage bushes common everywhere.

Spanish mission period 
After the 1769 expedition of Gaspar de Portolà, a Spanish expedition led by Junipero Serra named the area Valle de Santa Ana (Valley of Saint Anne). On November 1, 1776, Mission San Juan Capistrano became the area's first permanent European settlement. Among those who came with Portolá were José Manuel Nieto and José Antonio Yorba. Both these men were given land grants—Rancho Los Nietos and Rancho Santiago de Santa Ana, respectively.

The Nieto heirs were granted land in 1834. The Nieto ranches were known as Rancho Los Alamitos, Rancho Las Bolsas, and Rancho Los Coyotes. Yorba heirs Bernardo Yorba and Teodosio Yorba were also granted Rancho Cañón de Santa Ana (Santa Ana Canyon Ranch) and Rancho Lomas de Santiago, respectively. Other ranchos in Orange County were granted by the Mexican government during the Mexican period in Alta California.

Saint Junípero Serra y Ferrer and the early components of the Portolá Expedition arrived in modern-day San Diego, south of the present-day Orange County, in mid-late 1769. During these early Mission years, however, the early immigrants continued to rely on imports of both Mexican-grown and Spanish-grown wines; Serra repeatedly complained of the process of repeated, labored import. The first grape crop production was produced in 1782 at San Juan Capistrano, with vines potentially brought through supply ships in 1778.

19th century 
Viticulture became an increasingly important crop in Los Angeles and Orange Counties through the subsequent decades. By the 1850s, the regions supported more than 100 vineyards. In 1857, Anaheim was founded by 50 German-Americans (with lineage extending back to Franconia) in search of a suitable grape-growing region. This group purchased a 1,165 acres (4.71 km2) parcel from Juan Pacifico Ontiveros's Rancho San Juan Cajon de Santa Ana for $2 per acre and later formed the Anaheim Vineyard Company. With surveyor George Hansen, two of the wine colony's founders, John Frohling and Charles Kohler, planted 400,000 grapevines along the Santa Ana River; by 1875, "there were as many as 50 wineries in Anaheim, and the city’s wine production topped 1 million gallons annually." Despite later afflictions of both Phylloxera and Pierce's Disease, wine growing is still practiced.

A severe drought in the 1860s devastated the prevailing industry, cattle ranching, and much land came into the possession of Richard O'Neill Sr. James Irvine and other land barons. In 1887, silver was discovered in the Santa Ana Mountains, attracting settlers via the Santa Fe and Southern Pacific Railroads. High rates of Anglo migration gradually moved Mexicans into colonias, or segregated ethnic enclaves.

County establishment 
After several failed attempts in previous sessions, the California legislature passed a bill authorizing the portion of Los Angeles County south of Coyote Creek to hold a referendum on whether to remain part of Los Angeles County or to secede and form a new county to be named “Orange” as directed by the legislature. The referendum required a 2/3 vote for secession to take place, and on June 4, 1889, the vote was 2,509 to 500 in favor of secession. After the referendum, Los Angeles County filed three lawsuits to prevent the secession, but their attempts were futile. 

On July 17, 1889, a second referendum was held south of the Coyote Creek to determine if the county seat of the new county would be Anaheim or Santa Ana, along with an election for every county officer. Santa Ana defeated Anaheim in the referendum. With the referendum having passed, the County of Orange was officially incorporated on August 1, 1889. Since the incorporation of the county, the only geographical changes made to the boundary was when the County and Los Angeles County traded some parcels of land around Coyote Creek to conform to city blocks.

The county is said to have been named for the citrus fruit in an attempt to promote immigration by suggesting a semi-tropical paradise – a place where anything could grow.

20th century 

Other citrus crops, avocados, and oil extraction were also important to the early economy. Orange County benefited from the July 4, 1904, completion of the Pacific Electric Railway, a trolley connecting Los Angeles with Santa Ana and Newport Beach. The link made Orange County an accessible weekend retreat for celebrities of early Hollywood. It was deemed so significant that Pacific City changed its name to Huntington Beach in honor of Henry E. Huntington, president of the Pacific Electric and nephew of Collis Huntington. Transportation further improved with the completion of the State Route and U.S. Route 101 (now mostly Interstate 5) in the 1920s.

In the 1910s, agriculture in Orange County was largely centered on grains, hay, and potatoes by small farmers, accounting for 60% of the county's exports. The Segerstroms and Irvines once produced so many lima beans that the county was called "Beanville". By 1920, fruit and nut exports exploded, which led to the increase of industrialized farming and the decline of family farms. For example, by 1917, William Chapman came to own 350,000 acres in northeastern Orange County from the Valencia orange. Around the 1910s and 1920s, most of the barrios of Orange County, such as in Santa Ana, further developed as company towns of Mexican laborers, who worked in the industrial orange groves. Poor working conditions resulted in the Citrus Strike of 1936, in which more than half of the orange industry's workforce, largely Mexican, demanded better working conditions. The strike was heavily repressed, with forced evictions and state-sanctioned violence being used as tactics of suppression. Carey McWilliams referred to the suppression as "the toughest violation of civil rights in the nation."

The Los Angeles flood of 1938 devastated some areas of Orange County, with most of the effects being in Santa Ana and Anaheim, which were flooded with six feet of water. As an eight-foot-high rush of water further spilled out of the Santa Ana Canyon, forty-three people were killed in the predominately Mexican communities of Atwood and La Jolla in Placentia. The devastation from this event, as well as from the 1939 California tropical storm, meant that Orange County was in need of new infrastructure, which was supported by the New Deal. This included the construction of numerous schools, city halls, post offices, parks, libraries, and fire stations, as well as the improvement of road infrastructure throughout Orange County.

School segregation between Mexican and white students in Orange County was widespread in the mid 1940s, with 80% of Mexican students attending 14 segregated schools. These schools taught Mexican children manual education – or gardening, bootmaking, blacksmithing, and carpentry for Mexican boys and sewing and homemaking for girls – while white schools taught academic preparation. The landmark case Mendez vs. Westminster (1947) desegregated Orange County schools, after the Mendez family were denied enrollment into the 17th Street School in Westminster in 1944, despite their cousins with lighter skin being admitted, and were instead told to enroll at the Hoover Elementary School for Mexican children.

In the 1950s, agriculture, such as that involving the boysenberries made famous by Buena Park native Walter Knott, began to decline. However, the county's prosperity soared during this time. The completion of Interstate 5 in 1954 helped make Orange County a bedroom community for many who moved to Southern California to work in aerospace and manufacturing. Orange County received a further economic boost in 1955 with the opening of Disneyland.

In 1969, Yorba Linda-born Orange County native Richard Nixon became the 37th President of the United States.

In the late 1970s, Vietnamese and Latino immigrants began to populate central Orange County.

In the 1980s, Orange County had become the second most populous county in California as the population topped two million for the first time.

In the 1990s, red foxes became common in Orange County as a non-native mesopredator, with increasing urban development pushing out coyote and mountain lion populations to the county's shrinking natural areas.

In 1994, an investment fund meltdown led to the criminal prosecution of treasurer Robert Citron. The county lost at least $1.5 billion through high-risk investments in bonds. The loss was blamed on derivatives by some media reports. On December 6, 1994, the County of Orange declared Chapter 9 bankruptcy, from which it emerged on June 12, 1996. The Orange County bankruptcy was at the time the largest municipal bankruptcy in U.S. history.

Land use conflicts arose between established areas in the north and less developed areas in the south. These conflicts were over issues such as construction of new toll roads and the repurposing of a decommissioned air base. El Toro Marine Corps Air Station was designated by a voter measure in 1994 to be developed into an international airport to complement the existing John Wayne Airport. But subsequent voter initiatives and court actions have caused the airport plan to be permanently shelved. It has developed into the Orange County Great Park and housing.

21st century 
In the 21st century, the social landscape of Orange County has continued to change. The opioid epidemic saw a rise in Orange County, with unintentional overdoses becoming the third highest contributor of deaths by 2014. As in other areas, the deaths disproportionately occurred in the homeless population. However, deaths were widespread among affluent and poorer areas in Orange County, with the highest at-risk group being Caucasian males between the ages of 45-55. A 2018 study found that supply reduction was not sufficient to preventing deaths.

In 2008, a report issued by the Orange County Superior Court found that the county was experiencing a pet "overpopulation problem," with the growing number of pets leading to an increase in euthanasias at the Orange County Animal Shelter to 13,000 for the year alone.

Following the 2016 presidential election, Santa Ana become a sanctuary city for immigrants. This created an intense debate in Orange County surrounding politics toward immigration, with many cities opposing pro-immigration policies.

The COVID-19 pandemic in Orange County disproportionately affected lower income and Latino residents.

Implementation of renewable energy and climate change awareness in Orange County increased, with the city of Irvine pledging to be a zero-carbon economy by 2030 and Buena Park, Huntington Beach, and Fullerton pledging to move to 100% clean energy. Residential solar panel installation has rapidly increased, even among middle-income families, as a result of the state's residential solar program which began in 2006. 

In the 2010s, campaigns to conserve remaining natural areas gained awareness. By the early 2020s, some success was found, with the conservation of 24 acres in the West Coyote Hills of a total 510 acres and the Genga/Banning Ranch project moving forward, conserving some 385 acres, which was part of the Tongva village area of Genga. In 2021, the commemorative 1.5 acre Putuidem village opened after years of delays and campaigning by the Acjachemen.

Geography

It is the smallest county by area in Southern California, being just over 40% the size of the region's next smallest county, Ventura.

Orange County is bordered on the southwest by the Pacific Ocean, on the north by Los Angeles County, on the northeast by San Bernardino County, on the east by Riverside County, and on the southeast by San Diego County.

The northwestern part of the county lies on the coastal plain of the Los Angeles Basin, while the southeastern end rises into the foothills of the Santa Ana Mountains. Most of Orange County's population reside in one of two shallow coastal valleys that lie in the basin, the Santa Ana Valley and the Saddleback Valley. The Santa Ana Mountains lie within the eastern boundaries of the county and of the Cleveland National Forest. Santiago Peak and nearby Modjeska Peak, just  shorter, form a ridge known as Saddleback, visible from almost everywhere in the county. The Peralta Hills extend westward from the Santa Ana Mountains through the communities of Anaheim Hills, Orange, and ending in Olive. The Loma Ridge is another prominent feature, running parallel to the Santa Ana Mountains through the central part of the county, separated from the taller mountains to the east by Santiago Canyon.

The Santa Ana River is the county's principal watercourse, flowing through the middle of the county from northeast to southwest. Its major tributary to the south and east is Santiago Creek. Other watercourses within the county include Aliso Creek, San Juan Creek, and Horsethief Creek. In the North, the San Gabriel River also briefly crosses into Orange County and exits into the Pacific on the Los Angeles-Orange County line between the cities of Long Beach and Seal Beach. Laguna Beach is home to the county's only natural lakes, Laguna Lakes, which are formed by water rising up against an underground fault.

Regions of Orange County

Orange County is sometimes divided into northern and southern regions. There are significant political, demographic, economic and cultural distinctions between North and South Orange County. A popular dividing line between the two regions is the Costa Mesa Freeway.

North Orange County, including Anaheim, Fullerton, Garden Grove and Santa Ana, was the first part of the county to be developed and is culturally closer to neighboring Los Angeles County. This region is more Hispanic (mostly Mexican) and Asian (predominantly Vietnamese and Korean), more densely populated (Santa Ana is the fifth most densely-populated city in the United States with a population of over 200,000), younger, less wealthy and with higher unemployment. It has more renters and fewer homeowners and generally votes Democratic. There are notable exceptions to these general trends, such as strongly Republican Yorba Linda and affluent Anaheim Hills, North Tustin, and Villa Park. North Orange County is predominantly flat, giving way to the Santa Ana Mountains in the Northeast.

South Orange County is wealthier, more residential, more Republican, predominantly non-Hispanic white and more recently developed. Irvine, the largest city in the region, is an exception to some of these trends, being not only a major employment center, but also a major tech hub and education center with UCI. Furthermore, the city is an Asian plurality (both South and East Asian), and votes reliably Democratic in recent years. South Orange County almost always includes Irvine, Newport Beach, and the cities to their southeast, including Lake Forest, Laguna Beach, Mission Viejo, and San Clemente. Alternatively, Irvine and Newport Beach are sometimes seen as Central Orange County, acting as a transition zone between north and south; when this viewpoint is taken Tustin is also considered to be in central Orange County. Costa Mesa is sometimes included in South County, although it is located predominantly to the west of the Costa Mesa Freeway and is part of the even street grid network of north Orange County. Irvine is located in a valley defined by the Santa Ana Mountains and the San Joaquin Hills, while much of South Orange County is very hilly.

Another region of Orange County is the Orange Coast, which includes the six cities bordering the Pacific Ocean. These are, from northwest to southeast: Seal Beach, Huntington Beach, Newport Beach, Laguna Beach, Dana Point and San Clemente, although Seal Beach is sometimes viewed as an extension of neighboring Long Beach in Los Angeles County.

Commercial clusters — edge cities

Older cities like Santa Ana, Anaheim, and Fullerton have traditional downtowns dating back to the 19th century, with Downtown Santa Ana being the home of the county, state and federal institutions. However, far more commercial activity is concentrated in clusters of newer commercial development are found in the county's edge cities, the three largest being
along Interstate 5 between Disneyland and Downtown Santa Ana
South Coast Plaza to the Irvine Business Complex, and at 
Irvine Spectrum

Anaheim—Santa Ana edge city

A contiguous strip of commercial development (an edge city) stretches from Disneyland through to MainPlace Mall along the I-5 Santa Ana Freeway, straddling the city limits of Anaheim, Garden Grove, Orange, and Santa Ana, and in fact stretching between the original downtowns of those four cities.

Entertainment and cultural facilities include Disneyland Resort, Angel Stadium, Christ Cathedral (formerly Crystal Cathedral), City National Grove of Anaheim - a live concert venue, Discovery Cube Orange County, the Honda Center - home to the Anaheim Ducks of the NHL (National Hockey League), and the Anaheim Convention Center. Health care facilities include CHOC (Children's Hospital of Orange County), Kaiser Permanente Health Pavilion (Anaheim), St. Joseph Hospital (Orange), and the UCI Medical Center.

Retail complexes include Anaheim GardenWalk, Anaheim Marketplace (claiming to be the largest indoor swap meet in Orange County with more than 200 vendors), MainPlace Mall, Orange Town & Country, and The Outlets at Orange, originally a mall named "The City" which was the centerpiece of a planned, 1970s mixed-use development by the same name. There is commercial strip-style development including big box retailers along West Chapman Avenue in Orange (Marshalls, Ralphs), along Harbor Boulevard in Garden Grove (Burlington, Ross Dress for Less), and around Harbor Blvd. and Chapman Ave. in Anaheim (Target).

Major hotels line Harbor Boulevard from Disneyland south to Garden Grove: Grand Legacy at the Park, Hilton, Marriott, Courtyard, DoubleTree Suites, Hampton Inn, Hilton Garden Inn, Homewood Suites, Embassy Suites, Residence Inn, Hyatt Regency, Marriott Suites, Sheraton, and the Great Wolf Lodge. The Orange County Transit Authority studied the corridor as the possible route for a streetcar, a proposal that was dropped in 2018 due to opposition from Anaheim and other city governments.

In addition to suburban-style apartment complexes, Anaheim's Platinum Triangle is undergoing transformation from a low-density commercial and industrial zone into a more urban environment with high-density housing, commercial office towers, and retail space. Anaheim envisions it as a "downtown for Orange County". The  area undergoing this large-scale redevelopment includes the city's two major sports venues, the Honda Center and Angel Stadium of Anaheim.

National protected areas
Cleveland National Forest (part)
Seal Beach National Wildlife Refuge

Climate

Demographics

2020 census

Note: the US Census treats Hispanic/Latino as an ethnic category. This table excludes Latinos from the racial categories and assigns them to a separate category. Hispanics/Latinos can be of any race.

2018

2011

Places by population, race, and income

2010

The 2010 United States Census reported that Orange County had a population of 3,010,232. The racial makeup of Orange County was 1,830,758 (60.8%) White (44.0% non-Hispanic white), 50,744 (1.7%) African American, 18,132 (0.6%) Native American, 537,804 (17.9%) Asian, 9,354 (0.3%) Pacific Islander, 435,641 (14.5%) from other races, and 127,799 (4.2%) from two or more races. Hispanic or Latino of any race were 1,012,973 persons (33.7%).

The Hispanic and Latino population is predominantly of Mexican origin; this group accounts for 28.5% of the county's population, followed by Salvadorans (0.8%), Guatemalans (0.5%), Puerto Ricans (0.4%), Cubans (0.3%), Colombians (0.3%), and Peruvians (0.3%). Santa Ana with its population reportedly 75 percent Hispanic/Latino, is among the most Hispanic/Latino percentage cities in both California and the U.S., esp. of Mexican-American descent.

Among the Asian population, 6.1% are Vietnamese, followed by Koreans (2.9%), Chinese (2.7%), Filipinos (2.4%), Indians (1.4%), Japanese (1.1%), Cambodians (0.2%) Pakistanis (0.2%), Thais (0.1%), Indonesians (0.1%), and Laotians (0.1%). According to KPCC in 2014, Orange County has the largest proportion of Asian Americans in Southern California, where one in five residents are Asian American. There is also a significant Muslim population in the county.

2000
As of the census of 2000, there were 2,846,289 people, 935,287 households, and 667,794 families living in the county, making Orange County the second most populous county in California. The population density was 1,392/km2 (3,606/sq mi). There were 969,484 housing units at an average density of 474/km2 (1,228/sq mi). The racial makeup of the county was 64.8% White, 13.6% Asian, 1.7% African American, 0.7% Native American, 0.3% Pacific Islander, 14.8% from other races, and 4.1% from two or more races. 30.8% were Hispanic or Latino of any race. 8.9% were of German, 6.9% English and 6.0% Irish ancestry according to Census 2000. 58.6% spoke only English at home; 25.3% spoke Spanish, 4.7% Vietnamese, 1.9% Korean, 1.5% Chinese (Cantonese or Mandarin) and 1.2% Tagalog.

In 1990, still according to the census there were 2,410,556 people living in the county. The racial makeup of the county was 78.6% White, 10.3% Asian or Pacific Islander, 1.8% African American, 0.5% Native American, and 8.8% from other races. 23.4% were Hispanic or Latino of any race.

Out of 935,287 households, 37.0% had children under the age of 18 living with them, 55.9% married couples were living together, 10.7% had a female householder with no husband present, and 28.6% were non-families. 21.1% of all households were made up of individuals, and 7.2% had someone living alone who was 65 years of age or older. The average household size was 3.00 and the average family size was 3.48.

Ethnic change has been transforming the population. By 2009, nearly 45 percent of the residents spoke a language other than English at home. Whites now comprise only 45 percent of the population, while the numbers of Hispanics grow steadily, along with Vietnamese, Korean and Chinese families. The percentage of foreign-born residents jumped to 30 percent in 2008 from 6 percent in 1970. The mayor of Irvine, Sukhee Kang, was born in Korea, making him the first Korean-American to run a major American city. “We have 35 languages spoken in our city,” Kang observed. The population is diverse age-wise, with 27.0% under the age of 18, 9.4% from 18 to 24, 33.2% from 25 to 44, 20.6% from 45 to 64, and 9.9% 65 years of age or older. The median age is 33 years. For every 100 females, there were 99.0 males. For every 100 females age 18 and over, there were 96.7 males.

The median income for a household in the county was $61,899, and the median income for a family was $75,700 (these figures had risen to $71,601 and $81,260 respectively as of a 2007 estimate). Males had a median income of $45,059 versus $34,026 for females. The per capita income for the county was $25,826. About 7.0% of families and 10.3% of the population were below the poverty line, including 13.2% of those under age 18 and 6.2% of those age 65 or over.

Residents of Orange County are known as "Orange Countians".

Economy

Business

Orange County is the headquarters of many Fortune 500 companies including Ingram Micro (#62) and First American Corporation (#476) in Santa Ana, Broadcom (#150) in Irvine, Western Digital (#198) in Lake Forest, and Pacific Life (#269) in Newport Beach. Irvine is the home of numerous start-up companies and also is the home of Fortune 1000 headquarters for Allergan, Edwards Lifesciences, Epicor, and Sun Healthcare Group. Other Fortune 1000 companies in Orange County include Beckman Coulter in Brea, Quiksilver in Huntington Beach and Apria Healthcare Group in Lake Forest. Irvine is also the home of notable technology companies like TV and sound bar company VIZIO, router manufacturer Linksys, video/computer game creator Blizzard Entertainment, and in-flight product manufacturer Panasonic Avionics Corporation. Also, the prestigious Mercedes-Benz Classic Center USA is located in the City of Irvine. Many regional headquarters for international businesses reside in Orange County like Mazda, Toshiba, Toyota, Samsung, Kia, in the City of Irvine, Mitsubishi in the City of Cypress, Kawasaki Motors in Foothill Ranch, and Hyundai in the City of Fountain Valley. Fashion is another important industry to Orange County. Oakley, Inc. is headquartered in Lake Forest. Hurley International is headquartered in Costa Mesa. The network cyber security firm Milton Security Group is located in Brea. The shoe company Pleaser USA, Inc. is located in Fullerton. St. John is headquartered in Irvine. Tustin, is home to Ricoh Electronics, New American Funding, and Safmarine. Wet Seal is headquartered in Lake Forest. PacSun is headquartered in Anaheim. Restaurants such as Taco Bell, El Pollo Loco, In-N-Out Burger, Claim Jumper, Marie Callender's, Wienerschnitzel, have headquarters in the city of Irvine as well. Del Taco is headquartered in Lake Forest. Gaikai also has its headquarters in Orange County.

Shopping

Shopping in Orange County is centered around regional shopping malls, big box power centers and smaller strip malls. South Coast Plaza in Costa Mesa is the largest mall in California, the third largest in the United States, and 31st largest in the world. Other regional shopping malls include (from north to south): Brea Mall, The Village at Orange, The Outlets at Orange, MainPlace Santa Ana, Westminster Mall, Bella Terra in Huntington Beach, The Market Place straddling Tustin and Irvine, Irvine Spectrum Center, Fashion Island in Newport Beach, Five Lagunas and The Shops at Mission Viejo. Downtown Disney and Anaheim GardenWalk are specialized shopping and entertainment centers aimed at visitors. Power centers include La Habra Marketplace, Anaheim Plaza, and Anaheim Town Square. There is one major outlet mall, The Outlets at San Clemente.

Tourism
Tourism remains a vital aspect of Orange County's economy. Anaheim is the main tourist hub, with the Disneyland Resort's Disneyland being the second most visited theme park in the world. Also, Knotts Berry Farm gets about 7 million visitors annually and is located in the city of Buena Park. The Anaheim Convention Center holds many major conventions throughout the year. Resorts within the Beach Cities receive visitors throughout the year due to their close proximity to the beach, biking paths, mountain hiking trails, golf courses, shopping and dining.

Food culture
As recently as the 1990s, award-winning restaurants in Orange County consisted mostly of national chain restaurants with traditional American or Tex-Mex comfort food. In the late 1990s, Tim and Liza Goodell with chef Florent Marneau, and David Wilhelm, established culinary restaurant groups featuring nouvelle cuisine, gourmet burgers and more. The Orange County Register states that the "tipping point" came in 2007 when Marneaus founded Marché Moderne (since moved to Crystal Cove), and Top Chef chef Amar Santana opened a branch of Charlie Palmer (closed 2015), both at South Coast Plaza. Santana followed opening restaurants Broadway in Laguna Beach and Vaca in Costa Mesa. Other Top Chef chefs followed with their own restaurants including Brian Huskey (Tackle Box), Shirley Chung (Twenty Eight), Jamie Gwen of Cutthroat Kitchen, and from The Great Food Truck Race, Jason Quinn (Playground), who also opened three stands at the 4th Street Market food hall in Downtown Santa Ana in 2016.

Food halls with gourmet vendors include the  Anaheim Packing District, the 4th Street Market in Downtown Santa Ana, Lot 579 in Huntington Beach, Trade Food Hall in Irvine, OC Mix in Costa Mesa, and The Source OC in Buena Park.

In 2019, the Michelin Guide awarded stars for the first time to Orange County restaurants, awarding Hana Re and Taco Maria one star each. In 2021, Knife Pleat in Costa Mesa was awarded one Michelin star as well.

Arts and culture

Huntington Beach is a hot spot for sunbathing and surfing; nicknamed "Surf City, U.S.A.", it is home to many surfing competitions. "The Wedge", at the tip of The Balboa Peninsula in Newport Beach, is one of the most famous body surfing spots in the world. Southern California surf culture is prominent in Orange County's beach cities. Another one of these beach cities being Laguna Beach, just south of Newport Beach. A few popular beaches include A Thousand Steps on 9th Street, Main Street Beach, and The Montage. Other "local" beaches that are worth a visit are Tablerock Beach and West Street Beach, both located in South Laguna Beach.

Other tourist destinations include the theme parks Disneyland and Disney California Adventure Park in Anaheim and Knott's Berry Farm in Buena Park. Due to the 2022 reopening of Wild Rivers in Irvine, the county is home to two water parks along with Soak City in Buena Park. The Anaheim Convention Center is the largest such facility on the West Coast. The old town area in the City of Orange (the traffic circle at the middle of Chapman Avenue at Glassell Street) still maintains its 1950s image, and appeared in the movie That Thing You Do!.

Little Saigon is another tourist destination, home to the largest concentration of Vietnamese people outside Vietnam. There are also sizable Taiwanese, Chinese, and Korean communities, particularly in western Orange County. This is evident in several Asian-influenced shopping centers in Asian American hubs like Irvine. Popular food festival 626 Night Market has a location at OC Fair & Event Center in Costa Mesa and is a popular attraction for Asian and fusion food, as well as an Art Walk and live entertainment.

Historical points of interest include Mission San Juan Capistrano, the renowned destination of migrating swallows. The Richard Nixon Presidential Library and Museum is in Yorba Linda and the Richard Nixon Birthplace, on the grounds of the Library, is a National Historic Landmark. John Wayne's yacht, the Wild Goose or USS YMS-328, is in Newport Beach. Other notable structures include the home of Madame Helena Modjeska, in Modjeska Canyon on Santiago Creek; Ronald Reagan Federal Building and Courthouse in Santa Ana, the largest building in the county; the historic Balboa Pavilion in Newport Beach; and the Huntington Beach Pier. The county has nationally known centers of worship, such as Crystal Cathedral in Garden Grove, the largest house of worship in California; Saddleback Church in Lake Forest, one of the largest churches in the United States; and the Calvary Chapel.

Religion
In 2014, the county had 1,075 religious organizations, the sixth-highest total among all US counties (matching its status as the sixth-most-populous county in the US).

Orange County is the base for several religious organizations:
The Newport Beach California Temple, one of four temples operated by the Church of Jesus Christ of Latter-day Saints in Southern California.
Christ Cathedral (formerly Reverend Robert Schuller's Crystal Cathedral) is the cathedral of the Roman Catholic Diocese of Orange, located in Garden Grove.
University Synagogue, one of the world’s largest Reconstructionist Jewish synagogues located in Irvine to serve the sizable Jewish community in the area, especially students at nearby University of California, Irvine.
Beth Jacob Congregation of Irvine, the largest Orthodox Jewish synagogue between Los Angeles and San Diego, serving several thousand families.
Temple Beth El of South Orange County, located in Aliso Viejo, and built in 2001 to serve the fast-growing Jewish community in Orange County, this  synagogue can seat 1,400 congregants and is the largest by size in Orange County, and is one of the largest places of worship in the state in terms of size. Temple Beth El is affiliated with both the Reform and Conservative Judaism denominations.
Temple Bat Yahm of Newport Beach, is the largest Reform synagogue in Newport Beach and serves more than 500 families. 
Chabad of Orange County, serves more than 100,000 Jewish families at more than of a dozen of its synagogues and community centers located in Irvine, Laguna Woods, Newport Beach, Aliso Viejo, Mission Viejo, Rancho Santa Margarita, San Clemente, North Irvine, Laguna Niguel, Yorba Linda, Tustin, Dana Point, Huntington Beach and Laguna Beach. These synagogues adhere to the Chabad-Lubavitch school of Orthodox Judaism, but all Jews are welcome to worship regardless of denomination or background.
Temple Beth Emet of Anaheim, is the only synagogue in Anaheim and was the first Conservative Jewish synagogue to open in Orange County back in 1955.
Islamic Center of Irvine, which has raised over $5.5 million for its expansion project (as of October 2018).
Islamic Institute of Orange County, an Islamic Center in Orange County, located in Anaheim and founded in 1991.
The Islamic Society of Orange County in Garden Grove, established in 1976 and one of the largest mosques in the United States.
Islamic Center of Santa Ana (ICSA), which opened a new $2.6 million facility in 2017.
Orange County Islamic Foundation, located in Mission Viejo.
The Islamic Educational Center of Orange County (IECOC), located in Costa Mesa
Forty Martyrs Armenian Apostolic Church, located in Santa Ana is one of two Armenian Apostolic Church, otherwise referred to as "Armenian Orthodox Church" or "Gregorian Church" in Orange County. 
St. Mary Armenian Church, located in Costa Mesa is one of two Armenian Apostolic Church, otherwise referred to as "Armenian Orthodox Church" or "Gregorian Church" in Orange County. 
Family International, also known as "The Children of God", was founded in 1968 in Huntington Beach by David Berg.
Chuck Smith, early leader in the Jesus People movement and founder of Calvary Chapel in Costa Mesa.
Pao Fa Temple in Irvine is one of the largest Buddhist monasteries and temples in the United States.
The Purpose Driven Life author Rick Warren and his Saddleback Church (the largest church in California) are in Lake Forest.
The Roman Catholic Diocese of Orange headed by Bishop Kevin Vann. There are about 1.04 million Catholics in Orange County.
Trinity Broadcasting Network began as Channel 40 in Tustin, now in Costa Mesa.
Monasteries of the Vedanta Society and St. Michael's Abbey are located in Trabuco Canyon.
The Vineyard Christian Fellowship movement began in Orange County.
The Jain Center of Southern California in Buena Park, largest center for followers of Jain faith, originally started by Jains from India
The Sikh Center of Orange County located in Santa Ana
The Sikh Center of Buena Park - Gurdwara Singh Sabha
Harvest Orange County in Irvine. Also holds the Harvest Crusades in Anaheim Stadium.
Living Stream Ministry is headquartered in Anaheim and hosts several Christian conferences a year.
Orange County Buddhist Center in Laguna Hills, part of the Soka Gakkai International

Sports

Huntington Beach annually plays host to the U.S. Open of Surfing, AVP Pro Beach Volleyball and Vans World Championship of Skateboarding. It was also the shooting location for Pro Beach Hockey. USA Water Polo, Inc. has moved its headquarters to Irvine, California. Orange County's active outdoor culture is home to many surfers, skateboarders, mountain bikers, cyclists, climbers, hikers, kayaking, sailing and sand volleyball.

The Major League Baseball team in Orange County is the Los Angeles Angels. The team won the World Series under manager Mike Scioscia in 2002. In 2005, new owner Arte Moreno wanted to change the name to "Los Angeles Angels" in order to better tap into the Los Angeles media market, the second largest in the country. However, the standing agreement with the city of Anaheim demanded that they have "Anaheim" in the name, so they became the Los Angeles Angels of Anaheim. This name change was hotly disputed by the city of Anaheim, but the change stood, which prompted a lawsuit by the city of Anaheim against Arte Moreno, won by the latter. Prior to the 2016 Moreno and the club officially dropped the Anaheim moniker now simply going by the Los Angeles Angels. 

The county's National Hockey League team, the Anaheim Ducks, won the 2007 Stanley Cup beating the Ottawa Senators. They also came close to winning the 2003 Stanley Cup finals after losing in Game 7 against the New Jersey Devils.

The Toshiba Classic, the only PGA Champions Tour event in the area, is held each March at The Newport Beach Country Club. Past champions include Fred Couples (2010), Hale Irwin (1998 and 2002), Nick Price (2011), Bernhard Langer (2008) and Jay Haas (2007). The tournament benefits the Hoag Hospital Foundation and has raised over $16 million in its first 16 years.

Orange County SC is a United Soccer League team and are the only professional soccer club in Orange County. The team's first season was in 2011 and it was successful as Charlie Naimo's team made it to the quarter-finals of the playoffs. With home games played at Championship Soccer Stadium in Orange County Great Park the team looks to grow in the Orange County community and reach continued success. Former and current Orange County SC players include Richard Chaplow, Bright Dike, Maykel Galindo, Carlos Borja, and goalkeeper Amir Abedzadeh.

The National Football League left the county when the Los Angeles Rams relocated to St. Louis in 1995.

The National Basketball Association's Los Angeles Clippers played some home games at The Arrowhead Pond, now known as the Honda Center, from 1994 to 1999, before moving to Staples Center (now Crypto.com Arena), which they share with the Los Angeles Lakers.

Government

Orange County is a charter county of California; its seat is Santa Ana.

The elected offices of the county government consist of the five-member Board of Supervisors, Assessor, Auditor-Controller, Clerk-Recorder, District Attorney-Public Administrator, Sheriff-Coroner, and Treasurer-Tax Collector. Except for the Board of Supervisors, each of these elected officers are elected by the voters of the entire county and oversee their own County departments.

, the six countywide elected officers are:
Assessor: Claude Parrish, Republican (since January 5, 2015)
Auditor-Controller: Andrew Hamilton, CPA, Republican (since January 2, 2023)
Clerk-Recorder: Hugh Nguyen, Republican (since April 3, 2013)
District Attorney-Public Administrator: Todd Spitzer, Republican (since January 7, 2019)
Sheriff-Coroner: Don Barnes, Republican (since January 7, 2019)
Treasurer-Tax Collector: Shari Freidenrich, CPA, Republican (since January 3, 2011)

A seventh countywide elected officer, the County Superintendent of Schools (jointly with an independently elected County Board of Education) oversees the independent Orange County Department of Education.

Board of Supervisors

Each of the five members of the Board of Supervisors is elected from a regional district, and together, the board oversees the activities of the county's agencies and departments and sets policy on development, public improvements, and county services. At the beginning of each calendar year, the Supervisors select a Chair and Vice Chair amongst themselves. The Chair presides over board meetings, and the Vice Chair presides when the Chair is not present. The Board appoints the Clerk of the Board of Supervisors, the County Counsel, the Performance Audit Director, and the Director of the Office of Independent Review. The Board also appoints the County Executive Officer to act as the chief administrative officer of the county and the manager of all agencies and departments not under the sole jurisdiction of an elected county official nor the sole jurisdiction of one of the four aforementioned officers appointed by the Board.

, the members of the Orange County Board of Supervisors are:
District 1: Andrew Do, Republican (since February 3, 2015)
District 2: Vicente Sarmiento, Democrat (since January 2, 2023)
District 3: Donald P. Wagner, Republican (since March 27, 2019)
District 4: Doug Chaffee, Democrat (since January 7, 2019)
District 5: Katrina Foley, Democrat (since March 23, 2021)

Department of Education
The County Department of Education is wholly separate from the County government and is jointly overseen by the elected County Superintendent of Schools and the five-member Orange County Board of Education, whose trustees are popularly elected from five separate trustee areas.

, the six elected officials overseeing the Orange County Department of Education are:
Trustee Area 1: Jorge Valdes, Republican
Trustee Area 2: Mari Barke, Republican
Trustee Area 3: Ken Williams, Republican
Trustee Area 4: Tim Shaw, Republican
Trustee Area 5: Lisa Sparks, Republican
Superintendent of Schools: Al Mijares, Republican

Pension scandal

On July 12, 2010, it was revealed that former Sheriff Mike Carona received over $215,000 in pension checks in 2009, despite his felony conviction. A 2005 state law denied a public pension to public officials convicted of wrongdoing in office, however, that law only applied to benefits accrued after December 2005. Carona became eligible for his pension at age 50, and is also entitled, by law, to medical and dental benefits. It was noted that the county's retirement system faces a massive shortfall totaling $3.7 billion unfunded liabilities, and Carona was one of approximately 400 retired Orange County public servants who received more than $100,000 in benefits in 2009. Also on the list of those receiving extra-large pension checks is former treasurer-tax collector Robert Citron, whose investments, which were made while consulting psychics and astrologers, led Orange County into bankruptcy in 1994.

Citron, a Democrat, funneled billions of public dollars into questionable investments, and at first the returns were high and cities, schools and special districts borrowed millions to join in the investments. But the strategy backfired, and Citron's investment pool lost $1.64 billion. Nearly $200 million had to be slashed from the county budget and more than 1,000 jobs were cut. The county was forced to borrow $1 billion.

The California Foundation for Fiscal Responsibility filed a lawsuit against the pension system to get the list. The agency had claimed that pensioner privacy would be compromised by the release. A judge approved the release and the documents were released late June 2010. The release of the documents has reopened debate on the pension plan for retired public safety workers approved in 2001 when Carona was sheriff.

Called "3 percent at 50," it lets deputies retire at age 50 with 3 percent of their highest year's pay for every year of service. Before it was approved and applied retroactively, employees received 2 percent. "It was right after Sept. 11," said Orange County Supervisor John Moorlach. "All of a sudden, public safety people became elevated to god status. The Board of Supervisors were tripping over themselves to make the motion." He called it "one of the biggest shifts of money from the private sector to the public sector." Moorlach, who was not on the board when the plan was approved, led the fight to repeal the benefit. A lawsuit, which said the benefit should go before voters, was rejected in Los Angeles County Superior Court in 2009 and is now under appeal. Carona opposed the lawsuit when it was filed, likening its filing to a "nuclear bomb" for deputies.

Politics

During most of the 20th century and up until 2016, Orange County was known for its political conservatism and for being a bastion for the Republican Party, with a 2005 academic study listing three Orange County cities as among America's 25 most conservative. However, the county's changing demographics have coincided with a shift in political alignments, making it far more competitive in recent years. In 2016, Hillary Clinton became the first Democrat since 1936 to carry Orange County in a presidential election and in the 2018 midterm elections the Democratic Party gained control of every Congressional seat in the county. Although Democrats controlled all congressional districts in Orange County at the time, Republicans maintained a lead in voter registration numbers (although it shrunk to less than a percentage point as of February 10, 2019, as compared with over 10% on February 10, 2013). The number of registered Democrats surpassed the number of registered Republicans in the county in August 2019. As the number of Democrats increased, the number of voters not aligned with a political party increased to comprise 27.4% of the county's voters in 2019. Republicans hold a 3-2 majority on the county Board of Supervisors. Seven out of the 12 state legislators from Orange County are also Republicans.

Political history
From the mid-20th century until the 2010s, Orange County was known as a Republican stronghold and consistently sent Republican representatives to the state and federal legislatures — so strongly so, that Ronald Reagan described it as the place that "all the good Republicans go to die." Republican majorities in Orange County helped deliver California's electoral votes to Republican nominees Richard Nixon in 1960, 1968, and 1972; Gerald Ford in 1976; Reagan in 1980 and 1984; and George H. W. Bush in 1988. It was one of five counties in the state that voted for Barry Goldwater in 1964.

In 1936, Orange County gave Franklin D. Roosevelt a majority of its presidential vote. The Republican nominee won Orange County in the next 19 presidential elections, until Hillary Clinton won the county with a narrow majority in 2016. In 2020, Joe Biden further improved slightly on Clinton's 2016 margin of victory.

The Republican margin began to narrow in the 1990s and 2000s as the state trended Democratic until the mid- to late-2010s when it voted for the Democratic Party in 2016 and in 2018, when the Democratic party won every United States House District anchored in the county, including four that had previously been held by Republicans. This prompted media outlets to declare Orange County's Republican leanings "dead", with the Los Angeles Times running an op-ed titled, "An obituary to old Orange County, dead at age 129." While Republicans were able to recapture two of the seven U.S. House seats in Orange County in 2020, Democrats continue to hold the other five, with Biden winning the county by a slightly greater margin than Clinton and a majority of the votes in each of the seven congressional districts. Republicans still carry more weight at the local level, and in 2020 for the State Assembly elections, they won 50.2% of the vote and four out of seven seats of the county. In the 2022 Midterm Elections, no congressional districts flipped, though Republicans performed strongly in Orange County, with every statewide GOP candidate carrying it.

For the 118th United States Congress in the United States House of Representatives, Orange County is split between six congressional districts:
,
,
,
,
, and
.

The 40th, 45th, 46th, and 47th districts are all centered in Orange County. The 38th has its population center in Los Angeles County, while the 49th is primarily San Diego County-based.
132, 154, 188
In the California State Senate, Orange County is split into 7 districts:
,
,
,
,
,
, and
.

In the California State Assembly, Orange County is split into 9 districts:
,
,
,
,
,
,
,
, and
.

According to the California Secretary of State, as of February 10, 2019, Orange County has 1,591,543 registered voters. Of these, 34% (541,711) are registered Republicans, and 33.3% (529,651) are registered Democrats. An additional 28.5% (453,343) declined to state a political party.

Orange County has produced such notable Republicans as President Richard Nixon (born in Yorba Linda and lived in Fullerton and San Clemente), U.S. Senator John F. Seymour (previously mayor of Anaheim), and U.S. Senator Thomas Kuchel (of Anaheim). Former Congressman Christopher Cox (of Newport Beach), a White House counsel for President Reagan, is also a former chairman of the U.S. Securities and Exchange Commission. Orange County was also home to former Republican Congressman John G. Schmitz, a presidential candidate in 1972 from the ultra-conservative American Independent Party, John Birch Society member, and the father of Mary Kay Letourneau. In 1996, Curt Pringle (later mayor of Anaheim) became the first Republican Speaker of the California State Assembly in decades.

While the growth of the county's Hispanic and Asian populations in recent decades has significantly influenced Orange County's culture, its conservative reputation has remained largely intact. Partisan voter registration patterns of Hispanics, Asians and other ethnic minorities in the county have tended to reflect the surrounding demographics, with resultant Republican majorities in all but the central portion of the county. When Loretta Sanchez, a Blue Dog Democrat, defeated veteran Republican Bob Dornan in 1996, she was continuing a trend of Democratic representation of that district that had been interrupted by Dornan's 1984 upset of former Congressman Jerry Patterson. Until 1992, Sanchez herself was a moderate Republican, and she is viewed as somewhat more moderate than other Democrats from Southern California.

In 2004, George W. Bush captured 60% of the county's vote, up from 56% in 2000 despite a higher Democratic popular vote statewide. Although Barbara Boxer won statewide in the simultaneously-held senate election and fared better in Orange County than she did in 1998, Republican Bill Jones defeated her in the county, 51% to 43%. While the 39% that John Kerry received is higher than the percentage Bill Clinton won in 1992 or 1996, the percentage of the vote George W. Bush received in 2004 is the highest any presidential candidate has received since 1988, showing a still-dominant GOP presence in the county. In 2006, Senator Dianne Feinstein won 45% of the vote in the county, the best showing of a Democrat in a Senate race in over four decades, but Orange was nevertheless the only Coastal California county to vote for her Republican opponent, Dick Mountjoy.

The county is featured prominently in Lisa McGirr's book Suburban Warriors: The Origins of the New American Right. She argues that its conservative political orientation in the 20th century owed much to its settlement by farmers from the Great Plains, who reacted strongly to communist sympathies, the civil rights movement, and the turmoil of the 1960s in nearby Los Angeles — across the "Orange Curtain".

In the 1970s and 1980s, Orange County was one of California's leading Republican voting blocs and a subculture of residents with "Middle American" values that emphasized capitalist religious morality in contrast to West coast liberalism.

Orange County has many Republican voters from culturally conservative Asian-American, Middle Eastern and Latino immigrant groups. The large Vietnamese-American communities in Garden Grove and Westminster are predominantly Republican; Vietnamese Americans registered Republicans outnumber those registered as Democrats, 55% to 22% as of 2007, while as of 2017 that figure is 42% to 36%. Republican Assemblyman Van Tran was the first Vietnamese-American elected to a state legislature and joined with Texan Hubert Vo as the highest-ranking elected Vietnamese-American in the United States until the 2008 election of Joseph Cao in Louisiana's 2nd congressional district. In the 2007 special election for the vacant county supervisor seat following Democrat Lou Correa's election to the state senate, two Vietnamese-American Republican candidates topped the list of 10 candidates, separated from each other by only seven votes, making the Orange County Board of Supervisors entirely Republican; Correa is first of only two Democrats to have served on the Board since 1987 and only the fifth since 1963.

Even with the Democratic sweep of Orange County's congressional seats in 2018, as well as a steady trend of Democratic gains in voter registration, the county remains very Republican downballot. In much of the county, the district's congressperson is the only elected Democrat above the county level, and in some cases the only elected Democrat above the municipal level. Generally, larger cities–those with a population over 100,000, such as Anaheim, Santa Ana, and Irvine - feature a registration advantage for Democrats, while the other municipalities still have a Republican voter registration advantage. This is especially true in Newport Beach, Yorba Linda, and Villa Park, the three cities where the Republican advantage is largest. As of February 10, 2019, the only exceptions to the former are Huntington Beach and Orange, while exceptions to the latter include Buena Park, Laguna Beach and Stanton.

Similarly, despite Orange county supporting Democratic candidates for president in 2016, and 2020, there are still several smaller municipalities in the county that have continued to vote Republican for president. In addition to the aforementioned Newport Beach, Yorba Linda, and Villa Park, the cities of Huntington Beach, Dana Point, San Juan Capistrano, and San Clemente also supported Republican nominee Donald Trump for president twice.

Voter registration (2020 census)

Cities by population and voter registration (2020 census)

Former congressional districts

Crime 
The following table includes the number of incidents reported and the rate per 1,000 persons for each type of offense.

Cities by population and crime rate

Education

Orange County is the home of many colleges and universities, including:

Universities
Public
University of California, Irvine (UCI)
California State University, Fullerton (CSUF)
Private, religious
Chapman University
Concordia University Irvine
Hope International University
Trinity Law School
Vanguard University
Private, secular
Anaheim University
Soka University of America
Springfield College
Western State University College of Law
Whittier Law School

Colleges
Two-year (community colleges)
Coastline Community College
Cypress College
Fullerton College
Golden West College
Irvine Valley College
Orange Coast College
Saddleback College
Santa Ana College
Santiago Canyon College
Four-year
Fashion Institute of Design & Merchandising
Laguna College of Art and Design
Southern California Institute of Technology

Some institutions not based in Orange County operate satellite campuses, including the University of Southern California, National University, Pepperdine University, and Springfield College.

The Orange County Department of Education oversees 28 school districts.

Media
Orange County is served by media in Los Angeles, including its TV and radio stations. Two television stations—KOCE-TV, the main PBS station in the Southland and KDOC-TV, an independent—are located in Orange County.

There are a few radio stations that are actually located in Orange County. KYLA 92.7 FM has a Christian format. KSBR 88.5 FM airs a jazz music format branded as "Jazz-FM" along with news programming. KUCI 88.9 FM is a free form college radio station that broadcasts from UC Irvine. KWIZ 96.7 FM, located in Santa Ana, airs a regional Mexican music format branded as "La Rockola 96.7". KWVE-FM 107.9 is owned by the Calvary Chapel of Costa Mesa. KWVE-FM is also the primary Emergency Alert System station for the county. The Los Angeles Angels of Anaheim also own and operate a sports-only radio station from Orange, KLAA. KX 93.5 FM broadcasts out of Laguna Beach and features an eclectic mix of mostly alternative rock.

County-wide politics and government coverage is primarily provided by the Orange County Register and Voice of OC. OC Weekly was an alternative weekly publication, and Excélsior is a Spanish-language newspaper. A few communities are served by the Los Angeles Times publication of the Daily Pilot. Orange Coast was established in 1974 and is the oldest continuously published lifestyle magazine in the region. OC Music Magazine is also based out of Orange County, serving local musicians and artists.

The Orange County Plain Dealer (January 1898 to May 8, 1925), was a mostly Anaheim-based newspaper, and successor to The Independent, bought by James E. Valjean, a Republican and edited by him, a former editor of the Portsmouth Blade (Ohio).

Other newspapers were: Anaheim Daily Herald, Anaheim Gazette, Anaheim Bulletin.

Transportation
Transit in Orange County is offered primarily by the Orange County Transportation Authority. The American Public Transportation Association (APTA) cited OCTA as the best large public transportation system in the United States for 2005. OCTA manages the county's bus network and funds the construction and maintenance of local streets, highways, and freeways; regulates taxicab services; maintains express toll lanes through the median of California State Route 91; and works with Southern California's Metrolink to provide commuter rail service along three lines: the Orange County Line, the 91 Line, and the Inland Empire–Orange County Line.

Major highways

Ground transportation in Orange County relies heavily on three major interstate highways: the Santa Ana Freeway (I-5), the San Diego Freeway (I-405 and I-5 south of Irvine), and the San Gabriel River Freeway (I-605), which briefly passes through northwestern Orange County. The other freeways in the county are state highways, and include the Riverside and Artesia Freeway (SR 91) and the Garden Grove Freeway (SR 22) running east–west, and the Orange Freeway (SR 57), the Costa Mesa Freeway (SR 55), the Laguna Freeway (SR 133), the San Joaquin Transportation Corridor (SR 73), the Eastern Transportation Corridor (SR 261, SR 133, SR 241), and the Foothill Transportation Corridor (SR 241) running north–south. Minor stub freeways include the Richard M. Nixon Freeway (SR 90), also known as Imperial Highway, and the southern terminus of Pacific Coast Highway (SR 1). There are no U.S. Highways in Orange County, though two existed in the county until the mid-1960s: 91 and 101. US 91 went through what is now the state route of the same number, and US 101 was replaced by Interstate 5. SR 1 was once a bypass of US 101 (Route 101A).

 Interstate 5
 Interstate 405
 Interstate 605
 State Route 1
 State Route 22
 State Route 39
 State Route 55
 State Route 57
 State Route 72
 State Route 73
 State Route 74
 State Route 90
 State Route 91
 State Route 133
 State Route 142
 State Route 241
 State Route 261

Bus

The bus network comprises 6,542 stops on 77 lines, running along most major streets, and accounts for 210,000 boardings a day. The fleet of 817 buses is gradually being replaced by CNG (Compressed natural gas)-powered vehicles, which already represent over 40% of the total fleet. Service is operated by OCTA employees and First Transit under contract. OCTA operates one bus rapid transit service, Bravo, on Harbor Boulevard. In addition, OCTA offers paratransit service for the disabled (OC ACCESS), also operated by MV.

Rail

Since 1992, Metrolink has operated three commuter rail lines through Orange County, and has also maintained Rail-to-Rail service with parallel Amtrak service. On a typical weekday, over 40 trains run along the Orange County Line, the 91 Line and the Inland Empire–Orange County Line. Along with Metrolink riders on parallel Amtrak lines, these lines generate approximately 15,000 boardings per weekday. Metrolink also began offering weekend service on the Orange County Line and the Inland Empire-Orange County line in the summer of 2006. As ridership has steadily increased in the region, new stations have opened at Anaheim Canyon, Buena Park, Tustin, and Laguna Niguel/Mission Viejo. Plans for a future station in Placentia are underway and is expected to be completed by 2020.

Since 1938, the Atchison, Topeka, and Santa Fe Railroad and later Amtrak, has operated the Pacific Surfliner regional passenger train route (previously named the San Diegan until 2000) through Orange County. The route includes stops at eight stations in Orange County including, in northbound order, San Clemente Pier (selected trips), San Juan Capistrano, Laguna Niguel/Mission Viejo (formerly), Irvine Transportation Center, Santa Ana Regional Transportation Center, Orange Transportation Center (formerly), Anaheim Regional Transportation Intermodal Center (ARTIC), and Fullerton Transportation Center.

OC Streetcar, formerly known as the Santa Ana/Garden Grove Fixed Guideway Project, is a streetcar line connecting Downtown Santa Ana to the Depot at Santa Ana which is currently under construction and expected to open in 2023. OCTA has also proposed connecting the two systems via Harbor Boulevard and the West Santa Ana Branch corridor. Plans for a streetcar for Harbor Boulevard in Fullerton, Anaheim, and Garden Grove — the Anaheim Rapid Connection — were shelved in 2018.

Sea
A car and passenger ferry service, the Balboa Island Ferry, comprising three ferries running every five minutes, operates within Newport Harbor between Balboa Peninsula and Balboa Island in Newport Beach. The Catalina Flyer connects the Balboa Peninsula to Avalon with daily round-trip passage through about nine months of the year. The Catalina Express connects Dana Point to Avalon (with departures from two greater Long Beach ports also connecting to Two Harbors).

Air
Orange County's only major airport is John Wayne Airport; its abbreviation (SNA) refers to Santa Ana, the closest large town in the early 20th century. The airport is located in unincorporated territory surrounded by Newport Beach, Costa Mesa, and Irvine. On destination monitors with flights to SNA, the airport is usually described as "Orange County, CA". In 2014, its Thomas F. Riley Terminal handled over 9 million passengers annually and as of 2019, seven airline brands provide scheduled service.

Communities

Cities

Aliso Viejo
Anaheim
Brea
Buena Park
Costa Mesa
Cypress
Dana Point
Fountain Valley
Fullerton
Garden Grove
Huntington Beach
Irvine
La Habra
La Palma
Laguna Beach
Laguna Hills
Laguna Niguel
Laguna Woods
Lake Forest
Los Alamitos
Mission Viejo
Newport Beach
Orange
Placentia
Rancho Santa Margarita
San Clemente
San Juan Capistrano
Santa Ana (county seat)
Seal Beach
Stanton
Tustin
Villa Park
Westminster
Yorba Linda

Unincorporated communities

These communities are outside city limits in unincorporated county territory.

Planned communities
Orange County has a history of large planned communities. Nearly 30 percent of the county was created as master planned communities, the most notable being the City of Irvine, Coto de Caza, Anaheim Hills, Tustin Ranch, Tustin Legacy, Ladera Ranch, Talega, Rancho Santa Margarita, and Mission Viejo. Irvine is often referred to as a model master-planned city because its original seven villages (College Park, The Colony, The Ranch, Culverdale, The Racket Club, University Park, and Turtle Rock) were laid out by the Irvine Company of the mid-1960s before it was bought by a group of investors including Donald Bren.

In popular culture
Orange County has been the setting for numerous written works and motion pictures, as well as a popular location for shooting motion pictures.

The city of San Juan Capistrano is where writer Johnston McCulley set the first novella about Zorro, The Curse of Capistrano. It was published in 1919 and later renamed The Mark of Zorro.
Many of the novels of Dean Koontz are set in Orange County. Koontz lives in Newport Beach, a well known city on the county's coast.

Orange County was featured by Huell Howser in Road Trip Episode 109.

Since the fall 2003 premiere of the hit Fox series The O.C., and the 2006 Bravo series "The Real Housewives of Orange County", tourism has increased with travelers from across the globe hoping to see sights from the shows.

See also

List of museums in Orange County, California
List of people from Orange County, California
National Register of Historic Places listings in Orange County, California
Orange County (film)
Orange County Fair (California)
Orange County School of the Arts
Santiago Library System

Notes

References

Further reading
Robin Rockey, 100 Things to Do in Orange County Before You Die. Reedy Press, 2019.
Gustavo Arellano, Orange County: A Personal History. New York: Scribner, 2008.
Samuel Armor, History of Orange County, California: With Biographical Sketches of the Leading Men and Women of the County Who have been Identified with its Earliest Growth and Development from the Early Days to the Present. Los Angeles: Historic Record Company, 1921.
Mark Baldassare, When Government Fails: The Orange County Bankruptcy. San Francisco: Public Policy Institute of California, 1998.
Mike Heywood, A History of Orange County: Twelve Decades of Extraordinary Change, 1889 to 2010. n.c.: Aardvark Global Publishing, 2010.
Doris I. Walker. Orange County Then and Now (Then & Now). Thunder Bay Press, 2006.
Philippe Jorion and Robert Roper, Big Bets Gone Bad: Derivatives and Bankruptcy in Orange County. San Diego: Academic Press, 1995.
Rob Kling, Spencer C Olin, and Mark Poster, Postsuburban California: The Transformation of Orange County since World War II. Berkeley, CA: University of California Press, 1991.
Orange County Historical Society, Orange County. Charleston, SC: Arcadia, 2005.
An Illustrated History of Southern California: Embracing the Counties of San Diego, San Bernardino, Los Angeles and Orange, and the Peninsula of Lower California, From the Earliest Period of Occupancy to the Present Time; Together with Glimpses of their Prospects; Also, Full-Page Portraits of Some of their Eminent Men, and Biographical Mention of Many of their Pioneers and of Prominent Citizens of To-day. Chicago: Lewis Publishing Co., 1890.
The Majestic Empire: Orange County California. Santa Ana, CA: Orange County Board of Supervisors, 1964.
Orange County, California: The Story of Orange County. Santa Ana, CA: Board of Supervisors of Orange County, California, 1939.

External links

Orange County’s Changing Politics – slideshow by The New York Times
Orange County, California on National Association Of Counties
Filming Locations in Orange County 

 
California counties
Los Angeles metropolitan area
 
Counties in Southern California
1889 establishments in California
Populated places established in 1889
Government units that have filed for Chapter 9 bankruptcy
Majority-minority counties in California